KYYS (1250 AM) is a radio station broadcasting a Regional Mexican format. The station is licensed to Kansas City, Kansas, United States.  It is currently owned by Audacy, Inc. and operations are under an LMA with Reyes Media Group.

History

In Lawrence and Topeka
KYYS came on air in 1927 as WREN, operated by the Jenny Wren flour company in Lawrence, Kansas. It operated at 1090 kHz for its first months and then used 1180 kHz, shared with KFKU, the radio station of the University of Kansas. On November 11, 1928, as part of the implementation of the Federal Radio Commission's General Order 40, WREN and KFRU were moved to 1220 kHz. In March 1941, under the provisions of the North American Regional Broadcasting Agreement, the stations on 1220 kHz, including WREN and KFRU, moved to 1250 kHz. KFKU, which shared time with WREN between 1927 and 1987, used its transmission facilities as well. WREN's transmitter was located in the storage room of the Bowersock Mills and Power Company, with the microphone sitting atop empty flour sacks.

In 1947, WREN moved to Topeka and placed its transmitter a mile east of Grantville, Kansas, on US Highway 24. The station also created the world's largest wren, today installed in the median of a Topeka street, that topped the station's studios. In 1952, former Governor Alf Landon and his family bought WREN, owning it until a 1982 sale to the Kassebaum Radio Group.

December 21, 1987, saw WREN go silent as the station fell on hard financial times, thanks to unpaid salaries, wire service bills, income and Social Security taxes, and other lawsuits. Additionally, KFKU, which had no transmitter of its own, fell silent for good. It would not be until December 9, 1991, after nearly four years without broadcasting, that WREN would return to the air with a satellite-fed gospel music format.

In Kansas City
In 1995, WREN applied with the Federal Communications Commission (FCC) to move into Kansas City, exchanging its 5,000-watt Topeka facility for 15,000 watts day and 3,700 watts night from a new transmitter in Kansas City, Missouri. This move was approved in January 1997 and was followed by a sale to the Mortenson Broadcasting Company of Canton, a Christian broadcaster in 1997.

Expanded Band assignment

On March 17, 1997 the FCC announced that eighty-eight stations had been given permission to move to newly available "Expanded Band" transmitting frequencies, ranging from 1610 to 1700 kHz, with WREN authorized to move from 1250 to 1660 kHz.

On August 10, 1998 the new expanded band station on 1660 AM was assigned the call letters KBJC. The FCC's initial policy was that both the original station and its expanded band counterpart could operate simultaneously for up to five years, after which owners would have to turn in one of the two licenses, depending on whether they preferred the new assignment or elected to remain on the original frequency. However, this deadline has been extended multiple times, and both stations have remained authorized. One restriction is that the FCC has generally required paired original and expanded band stations to remain under common ownership.

Later history

Entercom acquired WREN in 1998, and the next year dropped the heritage WREN call sign used for 72 years in favor of KKGM, to complement a sports format, "1250 the Game". This began a run of four callsign changes in four consecutive years, as the station became KXTR in 2000 with classical music moved from 96.5 FM (having been affected by the move of its sports competitor to a better frequency), KWSJ in 2001, and KKHK in 2002. It was under the latter two callsigns that 1250 began broadcasting in Spanish for the first time, initially under the moniker "La Súper X".

KYYS was the longtime call-sign for a rock format station, first located at 102.1 MHz (now KCKC-FM) and, until January 2008, at 99.7 MHz (now KZPT). The calls were transferred to retain presence within the media market, yet has no ties to either of its predecessors.

References

External links

Reyes Media Group
FCC History Cards for KYYS (covering 1927-1981 as WREN)

YYS
Radio stations established in 1927
YYS
Mass media in Kansas City, Kansas
Audacy, Inc. radio stations
1927 establishments in Kansas